Ernest Jones (30 September 1869 – 23 November 1943) was an Australian sportsman, playing Test cricket and Australian rules football.

Jones played 19 Tests from 1894 to 1902 and represented Port Adelaide, North Adelaide and South Adelaide Football Clubs. Nicknamed Jonah, Jones was one of the best and fastest bowlers of his time, initially erratic but subsequently gaining control of line and length to good effect. Jones worked as a customs officer, and one of his claims to fame as a cricketer was that he was known as 'The man who bowled a ball through W. G. Grace's Beard' and was reputed to have broken Stanley Jackson's ribs.

His action was controversial and complained about in both England (in 1896) and Australia. Umpire Jim Phillips was given the job of enforcing the laws against illegal actions which had once more crept into the game in the late 1890s. Jones was first no-balled in a match between South Australia and the visiting English side in 1897–98. Phillips again no-balled him once in the 2nd Test of that series, Jones thus becoming the first bowler to be called for throwing in a Test match.

Sources
 Krueger, G. (2011) South Adelaide Football Club 1897–1907, Self-Published: Adelaide.

References

1869 births
1943 deaths
Australian cricketers
Australia Test cricketers
South Australia cricketers
Western Australia cricketers
South Adelaide Football Club players
North Adelaide Football Club players
Port Adelaide Football Club (SANFL) players
Port Adelaide Football Club players (all competitions)
Australian rules footballers from South Australia
People from Auburn, South Australia